Fatemeh Sultan Baghbanbashi (19th-century) was a royal consort of shah Naser al-Din Shah Qajar of Persia (r. 1848–1896). 

She was one of the most influential favorite consorts of the shah during the later part of his reign.

References

 

19th-century births
19th-century deaths
19th-century Iranian women
Qajar royal consorts